Devore is an unincorporated community in the southwest portion of Taylor Township, Owen County, in the U.S. state of Indiana. It lies just south of the intersection of County Road 1000 North and County Road 100 East (a.k.a. Tower Road and Devore Road), which is a community about ten miles north of the city of Spencer, the county seat of Owen County.  Its elevation is 755 feet (230 m), and it is located at  (39.4297683 -86.7527843). This community is also known as Mill Grove.

History
Devore was originally called Mill Grove, and under the latter name was laid out in 1835. A post office opened under the Devore name in 1893, and remained in operation until it was discontinued in 1904.

Geography
 Mill Creek flows just north of this community.
   U.S. Route 231 is just west of this community.

School districts
 Cloverdale Community Schools.

Political districts
 State House District 46
 State Senate District 39

References

External links
 Roadside Thoughts for Devore, Indiana
 Cloverdale Community Schools

Unincorporated communities in Owen County, Indiana
Unincorporated communities in Indiana